Queens was a federal electoral district in the province of Nova Scotia, Canada, that was represented in the House of Commons of Canada from 1867 to 1896. It was created by the British North America Act, 1867. It consisted of the County of Queen's. It was abolished in 1892 when it was merged into Shelburne and Queen's riding.

Members of Parliament

This riding elected the following Members of Parliament:

Election results

See also 
 List of Canadian federal electoral districts
 Past Canadian electoral districts

External links 
 Riding history for Queens (1867–1892) from the Library of Parliament

Former federal electoral districts of Nova Scotia